The Supersonic Storybook is the third album by American alternative rock group Urge Overkill. It was released on March 15, 1991 on Touch and Go Records, and was produced by Steve Albini, a former roommate of the band. The album was named by Material Issue's Jim Ellison, who was a good friend of the band.

Track listing
All songs written by Nash Kato and Eddie Roeser, except where noted.
"The Kids Are Insane"—2:55
"The Candidate"—5:00
"Today Is Blackie's Birthday"—3:18
"Emmaline" (Errol Brown, Tony Wilson) -- 5:54
"Bionic Revolution"—4:03
"What Is Artane?"—3:48
"Vacation in Tokyo"—3:45
"Henhough: The Greatest Story Ever Told" (Nash Kato, Blackie Onassis) -- 5:47
"Theme from Navajo"—4:25

Personnel
Eddie "King" Roeser - lead vocals, bass, guitars
Nash Kato - guitars, vocals (lead: tracks 3-4 & 8; co-lead: track 1)
Blackie Onassis - drums

References

Urge Overkill albums
1991 albums
Touch and Go Records albums
Albums produced by Steve Albini